Wolfgang Vogel (8 February 1940 – 2 October 1996) was a German mathematician who made contributions to commutative algebra and algebraic geometry.

Biography
In 1968 Vogel became a mathematics student at the Halle University. After finishing his degree in 1963 he worked as research scientist at the universities of Halle, Berlin and Innsbruck. In 1965 he received his Ph.D. in Halle. He was appointed to the teaching staff (Habilitation) in 1968. He was chairman of the department of pure mathematics from 1977 to 1991. In 1993 he was appointed Professor of Pure Mathematics, at Massey University. He died of cancer in Palmerston North at the age of 56.

Selected publications

References

External links

1940 births
1996 deaths
Scientists from Bremen
20th-century German mathematicians
Academic staff of the Massey University
Academic staff of the Martin Luther University of Halle-Wittenberg